Velbazhd Kyustendil is a Bulgarian association football club based in Kyustendil. The club currently competes in the A RFG Kyustendil, the fourth tier of Bulgarian football.

The club was founded in 1919. Velbazhd have spent the majority of their playing history between the second and third tiers of the Bulgarian football league system. They won first promotion to the A Group in 1954, and have played a total of 7 seasons in the top flight, with a longest continuous spell of six seasons (1995–2001). This is generally seen as the club's most successful period. Velbazhd finished third in A Group in 1999, 2000 and 2001, competed in the Intertoto Cup in the 2000–01 season, and reached the Bulgarian Cup final in 2001.

History

Velbazhd was formed in 1919, though the club changed its name in the following year to Sport Club Motsion. In 1928 they changed their name to Sport Club Borislav. From 1940 to 1945 the club is called Pautalia. After World War II they changed their name to Cherveno zname. In 1956 the club was renamed to Levski. In 1970 the club returned to its original name Velbаzhd, but from 1995 to 1999 again called Levski, under the ownership of Georgi Iliev.

In 1953 they were promoted to Bulgarian football's top division for the first time in their history. The 1954 season saw Velbazhd make their first appearance in the top flight of Bulgarian football. This first season was less successful and they were relegated back to the B PFG, finishing on 12th place.

In 1994–95 season, Velbazhd won their second promotion to A PFG. In 1998–99 season they finished 3rd, their highest ever league finish. In the following season Velbazhd also finished 3rd. The club's forward Mihail Mihaylov became A PFG top scorer with 20 goals.

In 2001 Velbazhd reached the Bulgarian Cup Final for the first time, beating Marek Dupnitsa, Metalurg Pernik, Spartak Pleven and Lokomotiv Sofia for a place in the final. However, they lost the final 1–0 to Litex Lovech.

Following the 2000-01 season, the owner of Velbazhd, Georgi Iliev decided to merge the club with Plovdiv-based team Lokomotiv Plovdiv, and move the new club to Plovdiv, with the intention of reviving Lokomotiv Plovdiv, who were struggling in the B group. Thus, starting from the 2001-02 season, Lokomotiv Plovdiv began playing in the A Group, while Velbazhd disappeared. 

In 2002, local fans from the city of Kuystendil decided to re-found the club, starting from the third tier, V Group. The club has been mostly competing at or below the third level since then.

Honours

Domestic

Bulgarian A Group:
 Third place (3): 1998–99, 1999–00, 2000–01

Bulgarian Cup:
 Runners-up (1): 2001

European record

League positions

Current squad 
As of 1 September 2015

Notable former players
The following is a list of notable footballers who have played for Velbazhd, with over 60 appearances, over 30 goals or having received recognition by their country in the form of international caps while playing for the club.

|-
|valign="top"|
Bulgaria
 Antoni Zdravkov
 Plamen Petrov
 Daniel Hristov
 Georgi Petrov
 Ivo Mihaylov
|width="33"| 
|valign="top"|
 Ilian Stoyanov
 Velko Hristev
 Petar Kolev
 Boyko Velichkov
 Mihail Mihaylov
|width="33"| 
|valign="top"|
Kyrgyzstan
 Nematjan Zakirov

Macedonia
 Vančo Trajanov

Note: For a complete list of Velbazhd Kyustendil players, see :Category:PFC Velbazhd Kyustendil players.

References

Velbazhd
Kyustendil
1919 establishments in Bulgaria